Xinglong may refer to the following locations in China:

 Xinglong County (兴隆县), Chengde, Hebei
 Xinglong Station (NAOC) (兴隆观测基地), an observatory situated in Xinglong County, Chengde, Hebei

Townships (兴隆乡) 
Xinglong Township, Anhui, in Jingde County
Xinglong Township, Baiyin, in Jingyuan County, Gansu
Xinglong Township, Xihe County, Gansu
Xinglong Township, Dafang County, Guizhou
Xinglong Township, Fuquan, Guizhou
Xinglong Township, Tongren, in Sinan County, Guizhou
Xinglong Township, Harbin, in Wuchang City
Xinglong Township, Wudalianchi, Heilongjiang
Xinglong Township, Gannan County, Heilongjiang
Xinglong Township, Henan, in Kaifeng County
Xinglong Township, Jiangsu, in Xuyi County
Xinglong Township, Jilin, in Fusong County
Xinglong Township, Ningxia, in Tongxin County
Xinglong Township, Shandong, in Jinxiang County
Xinglong Township, Tongjiang County, Sichuan
Xinglong Township, Xuyong County, Sichuan
Xinglong Township, Yunnan, in Yanjin County

Subdistricts 
 Xinglong Subdistrict, Wuzhou (兴龙街道), in Changzhou District, Wuzhou, Guangxi
Written as "兴隆街道":
 Xinglong Subdistrict, Mudanjiang, in Dong'an District, Mudanjiang, Heilongjiang
 Xinglong, Shaoyang, in Shuangqing District, Shaoyang, Hunan
 Xinglong, Longshan (兴隆街道), a subdistrict in Longshan County, Hunan.
 Xinglong Subdistrict, Jungar Banner, Inner Mongolia
 Xinglong Subdistrict, Nanjing, in Jianye District, Nanjing, Jiangsu
 Xinglong Subdistrict, Linjiang, Jilin
 Xinglong Subdistrict, Taonan, Jilin
 Xinglong Subdistrict, Fuxin, in Xinqiu District, Fuxin, Liaoning
 Xinglong Subdistrict, Jinzhou, in Taihe District, Jinzhou, Liaoning
 Xinglong Subdistrict, Panjin, in Xinglongtai District, Panjin, Liaoning
 Xinglong Subdistrict, Xi'an, in Chang'an District, Xi'an, Shaanxi
 Xinglong Subdistrict, Jinan, in Shizhong District, Jinan, Shandong
 Xinglong Subdistrict, Kenli County, Shandong
 Xinglong Subdistrict, Duodao, in Duodao District, Jingmen, Hubei

See also 
 Xinglong Station (disambiguation)
 Xinglong Town (disambiguation) (兴隆镇)